Khurram Shahzad (born 25 November 1999) is a Pakistani cricketer. He made his List A debut for Habib Bank Limited in the 2018–19 Quaid-e-Azam One Day Cup on 16 October 2018. In September 2019, he was named in Balochistan's squad for the 2019–20 Quaid-e-Azam Trophy tournament. He made his Twenty20 debut on 6 October 2020, for Balochistan in the 2020–21 National T20 Cup. In October 2021, he was named in the Pakistan Shaheens squad for their tour of Sri Lanka.

References

External links
 

1999 births
Living people
Pakistani cricketers
Balochistan cricketers
Habib Bank Limited cricketers
Nugegoda Sports and Welfare Club cricketers
Quetta Gladiators cricketers
Place of birth missing (living people)